Operation Blue Angel was a major Republic of Singapore Air Force operation in May 1993 to support the United Nations Transitional Authority in Cambodia (UNTAC) conducting UN-mandated elections in Cambodia held between the 23 to 28 May 1993.

Execution
On 20 May 1993, four RSAF Super Pumas from the 125 SQN and 62 personnel which included a team from the Medical Corps was dispatched to Cambodia. The Super Pumas were placed under the UNTAC Military Command and based at Stung Treng Airport, in Northeast Cambodia.

Operation Blue Angel ended 20 June 1993.

External links
 RSAF Helicopters in Overseas Operations, Pointer supplement September 1999

Military of Singapore